Bossiella is a genus of coralline algae with 5 recognised species.  It reproduces via conceptacles; individual thalli only produce conceptacles of a single sex.

Species
The  valid species currently considered to belong to this genus are:
Bossiella californica
Bossiella chiloensis
Bossiella compressa
Bossiella orbigniana
Bossiella plumosa

References

External links
Images of Bossiella at Algaebase

Corallinaceae
Red algae genera